Zachary Santo (born 8 April 1993) is an Australian professional rugby league footballer who currently plays for the Limoux Grizzlies in the Elite One Championship.

Background
Of Indigenous Australian Italian and Ni-Vanuatu descent, Santo was born in Townsville, Queensland, and grew up in Charters Towers. He played his junior rugby league for the Charters Towers Miners and later the Townsville Brothers, and attended Blackheath and Thornburgh College. While at Blackheath and Thornburgh, Santo was a Queensland Reds scholarship holder.

Playing career

Early career
In 2011, Santo joined the North Queensland Cowboys NYC squad on a trial and train contract and represented the Queensland under 18s team. That year he played in the Cowboys' 2011 NYC Grand Final defeat by the New Zealand Warriors. At the end of 2012, Santo won the Cowboys' NYC Player of the Year award.

In 2013, Santo played for the Queensland under 20s team. He finished his NYC career at the end of 2013 with 65 games, scoring 49 tries.

On 5 August 2013, Santo re-signed with the Cowboys on a 2-year contract and joined the Cowboys first grade squad in 2014.

2014
Santo started the 2014 season playing for the Cowboys' Queensland Cup team, the Mackay Cutters.

In round 17 of the 2014 NRL season, Santo made his NRL debut for the Cowboys against the St. George Illawarra Dragons.

2015

Santo spent the 2015 season playing for another Cowboys' feeder club, the Townsville Blackhawks, in the Queensland Cup. At the end of the 2015 season, he was released by the Cowboys.

In December, Santo signed a 1-year contract with the Canberra Raiders starting in 2016.

2016
Santo played for the Mount Pritchard Mounties in the NSW Cup. In September, Santo was named at fullback in the 2016 Intrust Super Premiership NSW Team of the Year.  Santo was a member of The Mounties side which lost in The NSW Cup Grand Final to Illawarra 21-20

2017
Santo was named in the Canberra Raiders squad for the 2017 NRL Auckland Nines.
On 25 May, Santo was immediately released from his final year of his Canberra contract, and signed a one and a half year deal with the New Zealand Warriors.

2018
On 16 May, Santo was granted a release from his Warriors' contract and re-joined the Townsville Blackhawks for the remainder of the season. During his time at the Warriors he didn't feature in a single NRL game.

2019
On 7 August, it was revealed that Santo had signed a contract to join the Limoux Grizzlies in the Elite One Championship.

Statistics

NRL

References

External links
New Zealand Warriors profile
Canberra Raiders profile
NRL profile

1993 births
Living people
Australian people of Vanuatuan descent
Australian rugby league players
Canberra Raiders players
Indigenous Australian rugby league players
Limoux Grizzlies players
Mackay Cutters players
Mount Pritchard Mounties players
North Queensland Cowboys players
Rugby league fullbacks
Rugby league players from Townsville
Rugby league wingers
Townsville Blackhawks players